Satkirin Kaur Khalsa is a Sikh preacher and prolific Sikh Kirtan singer. She hosts a Kundalini Yoga show on the JUS Punjabi television channel.

Life
She was married to Govinda Singh, after she converted to Sikhism. She was nominated as the Granthi in the Los Angeles Gurudwara in 1974 and currently serves at the Manhattan Gurudwara. She has had the opportunity of singing the opening prayer for the Opening Ceremony of the 2009 United Nations General Assembly on Climate Change. She has performed in Colombia, Ecuador, Peru, Paraguay, Bolivia, Argentina, Chile, India, Malaysia, and United States of America. She hosts a show named JUS Yoga every Saturday & Sunday morning (10am-10:15 am EST) on JUS Punjabi TV.

Discography
She is well known for her expertise in Sikh devotional music. She got the knowledge of Ragas from many leading music scholars like Bibi Amarjit Kaur, Bhai Jaspal Singh, Bhai Pargat Singh, and Ustaad Narinder Singh and Bhai Hari Singh of Patiala Gharana. Her recorded works include:

 Ignite Your Light: Musical Meditation for Beginners
 Ajai Alai
 Jaap Sahib – Gobinday Mukunday & Ajai Alai
 Mangala Charan of Jaap Sahib
 Guru Guru Wahe Guru
 Chatara Chakara Vartee
 Lightness of Being
 Universal Prayer
 Ra Ma Da Sa Sa Se So Hung
 Melody and Majesty
 Shabd I
 Shabd II

See also
 Sikhism
 Guru Granth Sahib
 Sikh Gurus

References

American Sikhs
American yoga teachers
Converts to Sikhism